Garnet Campbell "Garth" Chester (1916 – 16 June 1968) was a New Zealand furniture designer.

Early life
Chester was born in South Africa in 1916.

Career
He established the furniture firm, originals in Penrose, Auckland, and later set up a showroom in France Street (now called Mercury Lane), just off Karangahape Road in Auckland. Several of his designs became highly popular, including the Astoria Chair, the Bikini chair and the Curvesse chair, the latter “an undisputed icon of New Zealand design,” according to Douglas Lloyd Jenkins. He died in 1968, aged 52.

Collections
His work is held in the collections of Museum of New Zealand Te Papa Tongarewa and Auckland War Memorial Museum.

References

1916 births
New Zealand furniture designers
1968 deaths
People from Auckland
South African emigrants to New Zealand